Martin Milan Šimečka (born 3 November 1957) is a Slovak  journalist and writer.

Life and career 
He received technical training at the Slovnaft plant in Bratislava, then held a series of odd jobs. Until 1989, all of his works were published and distributed as samizdat.

In 1990 he founded the independent publishing house Archa, where he worked as chief editor until 1996. From 1997-2006, he was the editor-in-chief of SME, Slovakia's leading daily newspaper. From 2006 until 2008, he was editor-in-chief of the magazine Respekt, where he served as editor and contributor. Since 2016, he has been an editor at Denník N, a newspaper and internet service.

He received the Jiří Orten Award in 1988 for his autobiographical novel Žabí rok. The Jiří Orten Award is awarded to a work of prose or poetry whose author is no older than 30 at the time of the work's completion. In 2018, he was awarded the Order of Ľudovít Štúr, 1st Class.

Awards 
 1988 Jiří Orten Award
 2018 Order of Ľudovít Štúr, 1st Class

Bibliography 
 Žabí rok, 1985. In English translation: Year of the Frog. Touchstone Books, 1996. ; .
 Džin. Archa, 1990.
 Záujem. Torst, 1997.
 Hľadanie obáv. Kalligram, 1998. 
 Medzi Slovákmi. N Press, 2017. 
 Světelná znamení. Salon, 2018. 
 Telesná výchova. N Press, 2020. 
 Všetko malo byť inak: Slovensko po roku 1945. Centrum environmentálnej a etickej výchovy ŽIVICA, 2020. 
 Príhody tuláka po Slovensku. N Press, 2022.

References 

Living people
1957 births
Slovak writers
Order of Ľudovít Štúr